PLAY! A Video Game Symphony was a concert series that featured music from video games performed by a live orchestra. The concerts from 2006 to 2010 were conducted by Arnie Roth. From 2010, Andy Brick took the position of principal conductor and music director. Play! was replaced by the Replay: Symphony of Heroes concert series.

History
In 2004, Jason Michael Paul was approached by Square Enix to organize a concert for music from its Final Fantasy series. After the concert sold out in a few days, Paul decided to turn video game music concerts into a series. Arnie Roth, who had previously conducted the Dear Friends - Music from Final Fantasy and More Friends: Music from Final Fantasy concerts, was selected to conduct the concerts. Andy Brick, who had previously conducted the Symphonic Game Music Concerts, was chosen as the associate conductor. The concerts are performed by local symphony players and choirs.

Play! premiered on May 27, 2006 at the Rosemont Theater in Rosemont, Illinois. The premiere show featured performances by Koji Kondo, Angela Aki, and Akira Yamaoka, and composers Nobuo Uematsu, Yasunori Mitsuda, Yuzo Koshiro and Jeremy Soule were in attendance.

Concerts
Each concert features segments of video game music performed by a live orchestra and choir, with video footage from the games shown on three screens. An opening fanfare, written by Nobuo Uematsu, is performed at each show. Music from all video game eras is performed at the shows.

According to Paul, the show is a "straightforward music program," designed "to keep the arts alive in a way that is classy."

Performed music
Music from the following games has been performed at Play!:

ActRaiser
Apidya
Battlefield
Black
Blue Dragon
Castlevania
Chrono Cross
Chrono Trigger
Commodore 64-Medley
Commodore Amiga-Medley
Daytona USA
Dragon Age: Origins
Dreamfall
Final Fantasy
Guild Wars
Halo
Kingdom Hearts
Lost Odyssey
Metal Gear Solid
Prey
Shadow of the Colossus
Shenmue
Silent Hill
Sonic the Hedgehog
Stella Deus
Super Mario Bros.
Super Mario World
The Chronicles of Riddick: Escape from Butcher Bay
The Darkness
The Elder Scrolls III: Morrowind
The Elder Scrolls IV: Oblivion
The Legend of Zelda
The Revenge of Shinobi
Ys
World of Warcraft

Album
On January 9, 2009, a live album CD and DVD of the concert was released. It was recorded in Prague and was performed by the Czech Philharmonic Chamber Orchestra.

Reception and legacy
The concerts have been well received. Audiences regularly give standing ovations after each song. Jeremy Soule, composer of the music for The Elder Scrolls IV: Oblivion, said that he "consider[s] 'Play' to be the ultimate video-game surround system."

According to Paul, Play! helps to promote the work of composers, as well as "lend credibility to the genre of video-game music." Roth stated that the concerts help to also push the classical industry forward and to "draw new audiences." According to Soule, video game concerts can help to educate old generations "that game music isn't just a bunch of bleeps and bloops." One associate conductor stated that the performance crosses the generational gap, bringing together older and younger generations.

See also
Dear Friends: Music from Final Fantasy
Symphonic Game Music Concert
Tour de Japon
Orchestral Game Concert
Video Games Live
Gamer Symphony Orchestra at the University of Maryland

References

External links

Video game concert tours
2006 in video gaming
2007 in video gaming
2010 in music
2010 in video gaming
2008 in video gaming
2009 in video gaming
2006 in music
2007 in music
2008 in music
2009 in music